Cambridge is Tim Rawle's introduction to the architectural history of Cambridge. Concise essays telling the story of the city's growth from Roman times to the present day and of the development of the colleges of the University of Cambridge are profusely illustrated with Rawle's photographs of townscapes and views of the colleges.

Summary
Dr Peter Richard's review in CAM captures the book's essence: "At the heart of the book lies a fascinating exploration of seven hundred years of University architecture," he wrote. "In a succession of striking images, Rawle examines halls and chapels, bridges, lanterns, gate towers and gardens. Accompanying the pictures are well informed captions and a substantial stylishly written essay that traces the city's history from Roman times."

Critical reception
Writing in the Sunday Telegraph, Clover Stroud commented: "It takes a book such as this to remind us that there are places in Britain to rival any city in the world for architectural splendour." John Graham in the Catholic Herald remarked on the "strikingly beautiful photographs, which avoid the usual clichéd images, depicting instead the university's more unusual and private corners" and on the "excellent essay on the development of the colleges", "On more than one occasion," he noted,"I had the eerie sense of actually looking at the building itself when perusing the photograph." Paul Kirkley's two-page illustrated feature on the book published in Cambridge Evening News gives a glimpse of how Rawle's photography captures "the hidden beauty" of the city.  Peter Richards, in his CAM review, wrote: "This is, quite simply, the best introduction to Cambridge ever published."

References

External links
 Book's official web page

2005 non-fiction books
2016 non-fiction books
Architecture books
Books about Cambridge
History books about England
History of Cambridge
History of the University of Cambridge